The Duke Is Tops is a 1938 American musical film released by Million Dollar Productions and directed by William Nolte. The film was later released in 1943 under the title The Bronze Venus. It features top-billed Lena Horne in her film debut. The film was one of the low-budget musical film "race movies" made in the 1930s and 1940s for the African-American market. The casts and production teams of these films were almost all black, and the music reflected current tastes in jazz and rhythm and blues. The film was scripted, co-directed and featured Ralph Cooper who also acted as the film's production manager.

Casting
Ralph Cooper planned to star alongside Nina Mae McKinney as the female lead but her delayed return from her appearances in Australia led to the role to be recast.

The Duke Is Tops features the film debut of singer Lena Horne, then aged 20, who had yet to develop the style she would use in her later films for Metro-Goldwyn-Mayer. She has a rare major acting role in this film, absent from her later career except for 1943's Cabin in the Sky, Stormy Weather and a few others. The original top-billed star, Ralph Cooper, was host of Amateur Night at the Apollo Theater for 50 years.  He also served as the movie's production manager.

Plot
Duke Davis (Cooper) is a stage-show promoter in love with Ethel Andrews (Horne), a popular singer in his company dubbed "the Bronze Venus".  Duke finds out that big-time promoters from New York City want to propel Ethel into the big leagues, but Ethel, out of loyalty and love for Duke, refuses to leave his small-time show. Duke, in a selfless act, orchestrates a deception to force Ethel to leave his show in order to better her career. However, the loss of the Bronze Venus causes Duke's own career to collapse and he soon finds himself working on a travelling medicine show where he goes from town to town, introducing a series of specialty musical acts and helping to sell Doc Dorando's all-purpose elixir. But when he hears that Ethel's New York gig is a flop, Duke goes to New York, where he is reunited with her. Soon after, Duke combines his stage show, the medicine show and Ethel's singing into a top nightclub act.

Cast
 Ralph Cooper – Duke Davis
 Lena Horne – Ethel Andrews
 Laurence Criner – Doc Dorando (credited as Lawrence Criner)
 Monte Hawley – George Marshall
 Neva Peoples – Ella
 Vernon McCalla – Mason (credited as Vernon McCallum)
 Edward Thompson – Ferdie Fenton
 Johnny Taylor – Dippy, 'Prince Alakazoo'
 Ray Martin – Joe
 Guernsey Morrow – Ed. Lake (credited as Guernsey Morrow) 
 Charles Hawkins – Sam, the Stage Manager (credited as Charlie Hawkins)
Speciality acts appearing throughout the film:  Willie Covan, Basin Street Boys, Rubberneck Holmes, Cats and the Fiddle, Marie Bryant, and Swing Band Harlemania Orchestra.

Music
The movie features singer Lena Horne and the Cats and the Fiddle singing group. Horne as Ethel sings the Harvey Brooks & Ben Ellison composition "I Know You Remember", with lyrics apropos of the film, "You & I have made a small beginning..."  Horne also sings "Don't Let Our Love Song Turn Me Blue", with a lyric that foreshadows one of her future great roles: "True love will guide us through stormy weather"; and she reprises "I Know You Remember".  The Cats & the Fiddle sing "Killin' Jive."

Distribution
The Duke Is Tops has been released on DVD in North America. The film is in the public domain in America, and as such is available in multiple editions.

References

External links

 
 
 

1938 films
American romantic musical films
American black-and-white films
Films set in New York City
Race films
Articles containing video clips
1930s romantic musical films
Toddy Pictures Company films
1930s English-language films
1930s American films